Sporting Life''' is an American record producer, rapper, songwriter and visual artist. He is best known for being a member of New York City hip hop group Ratking with American rappers Wiki and Hak. Adiele has since gone on to release several solo albums and extended plays (EPs) under R&S Records.

Discography
Studio albums

Extended plays

Compilations

Guest appearances

Production discography

2011

 Wiki - 1993 01. "Retired Sports"
 02. "Pretty Picture"
 03. "646 - 704 - 2610"
 04. "Piece of Shit"
 05. "Wikispeaks"
 06. "Sporting Life"

2012

 Ratking - Wiki93 01. "Retired Sports"
 02. "Pretty Picture"
 03. "646 - 704 - 2610"
 04. "Piece of Shit"
 05. "Wikispeaks"
 06. "Comic"
 07. "Sporting Life"

2013

 Ratking -
 "100"

2014

 Ratking - So It Goes 01. "*" 
 02. "Canal"
 03. "Snow Beach" 
 04. "So Sick Stories" (featuring King Krule) 
 05. "Remove Ya"
 06. "Eat" 
 07. "So It Goes"
 08. "Puerto Rican Judo" (featuring Wavy Spice)
 09. "Protein" 
 10. "Bug Fights"
 11. "Take" (featuring Salomon Faye)
 12. "Cocoa '88" (featuring DJ Dog Dick)

2015

 Ratking - 700-Fill 01. "American Gods" (featuring Remy Banks, Teddy and Slicky Boy)
 02. "Arnold Palmer"
 03. "Bethel"
 04. "Eternal Reveal"
 05. "Flurry"
 06. "Lepane Lane" (featuring Slicky Boy)
 07. "Steep Tech" (featuring Despot and Princess Nokia)
 08. "Sticky Trap"
 09. "Makeitwork"

 Remy Banks - higher. 01. "inhale."
 02. "let em know."
 10. "feast." (featuring Hak)

 Wiki - Lil Me 01. "WikiFlag" 
 04. "Hit the L" (featuring Hak) 
 05. "Old Blocks New Kids" (featuring Jadasea) 
 06. "Cherry Tree" (featuring Micachu) 
 09. "Lil Me" 
 13. "Patience" (featuring Antwon)
 15. "Ioneedmuch" (featuring Teddy AF)

 Kelela - Hallucinogen Remixes 03. "Rewind (Sporting Life Remix)"

2017

 Eric Copeland - Black Bubblegum Remixed 04. "Rip It (Sporting Life Remix)"

 Wiki - No Mountains in Manhattan 05. "Chinatown Swing"
 10. "Pandora’s Box" (featuring Evy Jane) 

2019

 MIKE - Tears of Joy 09. "It's Like Basketball" 

 Wiki - Oofie''
 06. "4 Clove Club"

References

Living people
American hip hop musicians
1988 births
American people of Nigerian descent
African-American musicians
21st-century African-American people
20th-century African-American people